David Michael Hurst Jr. is an American attorney who served as the United States attorney for the United States District Court for the Southern District of Mississippi from 2017 to 2021. Prior to assuming that role, he was the director of the Mississippi Justice Institute and general counsel for the Mississippi Center for Public Policy. Hurst Jr. previously served as an assistant United States attorney in the Southern District of Mississippi, as legislative director and counsel to Congressman Chip Pickering, and as counsel to the Constitution Subcommittee of the United States House Committee on the Judiciary. Hurst ran for Attorney General of Mississippi in 2015, losing to Democratic incumbent Jim Hood.

In May 2019, the Jackson, Mississippi, city council awarded a resolution to Hurst due to Hurst's role in apprehending the murderer of Brittany Green, who was shot to death at a gas station.

In August 2019, Hurst announced immigration raids in Mississippi which he said were "the largest single state immigration enforcement operation in our nation's history." The workers faced charges including illegal reentry, misuse of Social Security numbers, impersonation of U.S. citizens, and other identity crimes.

On January 7, 2021, Hurst announced his resignation, effective January 19, 2021.

References

External links
 Biography at U.S. Department of Justice

Living people
21st-century American lawyers
Assistant United States Attorneys
East Central Community College alumni
George Washington University Law School alumni
Millsaps College alumni
Mississippi lawyers
Mississippi Republicans
People from Hickory, Mississippi
United States Attorneys for the Southern District of Mississippi
Year of birth missing (living people)